SoHo Tampa, short for "South Howard Avenue (Tampa)" is a residential district within the Hyde Park neighborhood of Tampa. Some of the main cross streets are Kennedy Boulevard (SoHo's starting point), Cleveland Street, Platt Street, and Swann Avenue. The area has historic architecture and is within walking distance of Bayshore Boulevard where it terminates (two miles away from the entertainment district). The much praised Bern's Steak House is located in the district. Other high-end restaurants and nightlife venues are located here. Other offerings are high-end locally owned clothing boutiques, art galleries, dessert cafes, and a Starbucks. One of only three Publix GreenWise Markets is also located in the district. As of 2009, small companies have sprung up utilizing NEVs to shuttle clubgoers between core neighborhoods including SoHo and Channelside.

In 2009, a small park dedicated to Bern Laxer, late founder of Bern's Steakhouse, opened at the southern part of the district. At the center of the park is the "Three Graces" sculpture and a lighted fountain that is the first in Tampa to use reclaimed water.

See also
Channelside
Columbus Drive (Tampa)
Davis Islands
Downtown Tampa
Grand Central, similar district across the bay in St. Pete
Harbour Island
Howard Avenue (Tampa)
Hyde Park Village, shopping district a few blocks over
Palma Ceia, neighborhood's "Design District" contains similar high-end dining and shopping
Ybor City

References

Neighborhoods in Tampa, Florida
Entertainment districts in Florida
Restaurant districts and streets in the United States